Vladimir Jovanović (28 September 1833 – 3 March 1922) was a Serbian political theorist, economist, politician,  philosopher, political and literary writer and activist for the unification of all Serbian lands in the Balkans.

Biography

Jovanović was educated at the Universities of Vienna, Berlin in agricultural and economic sciences, and Belgrade, where he stayed at the home of his father's relatives, the brothers Dimitrije and Matija Matić. Abroad, he attended the lectures of Karl Heinrich Rau's son Ludwig at Hohenhaven Agricultural Academy and Wilhelm Georg Friedrich Roscher in Vienna. In Belgrade, the Matić house was much more than just a place to stay. It was an educational experience for Jovanović in its own right. In Serbia, Matić was а Professor of Economics at Belgrade's Grandes écoles, Minister of Finance, President of the Serbian Scientific Society and a corresponding member of the Serbian Royal Academy.

In 1863 he went to Britain in order to raise sympathies in Britain for the efforts of Serbia to liberate herself from the Ottoman Empire. On that occasion, he published an essay "The Serbian Nation and the Eastern Question". In his travels, through Europe, he met leading political revolutionaries. On the eve of the 1866 war against Austria, Mazzini said to Vladimir Jovanović that Italy should not rely on France in her struggle against the Habsburgs, but on the South Slavs under Vienna's yoke. Revolutions were to have started simultaneously in Venice and in the Balkan provinces of Austria; the Magyar revolution which was to follow have brought about the end of the Habsburgs.

He was a liberal thinker propagating emancipation, individual liberty, and education. Jovanović was influenced by John Stuart Mill and the British parliamentary system. Vladimir Jovanović was one of several major founding members of the Družina mladeži srpske (Association of Serbian Youth, including Svetozar Miletić, Svetozar Marković, Jevrem Grujić, Milovan Janković, Jovan Ilić, etc. The Youth was among the first organizations to raise the Serbian consciousness in all Serbian lands, then occupied by foreigners, European and Ottoman alike.

His major work is the Political Dictionary (1870–1873). His son was Slobodan Jovanović, the leading Serbian interwar historian and jurist.

Political career

Jovanović's life and political career are inseparable from the history of Serb liberalism. His first important public appearance was at the National Assembly in 1858, when it overthrew the autocratic power of Karađorđević. This was the first time that the liberals had acted as an independent political group. They demanded the restriction of the prince's power, the establishment of governmental rule, and the codification of human rights both in the civil and economic spheres. Jovanović was also deeply involved when the liberals first wavered and gave up much of their original program and principles, accepting the autocracy of the Obrenović princes, who were restored to power at the request of the National Assembly. The liberals were convinced that the most effective way of achieving their ultimate goals of liberating the Serb territories from Ottoman and Habsburg oppression and establishing an independent state was to have a prestigious dynasty and a strong, centralized power in the principality.

Vladimir Jovanović drafted a Political Dictionary which was basically an encyclopedic summary of liberal ideas. The Dictionary was first published in Novi Sad, then under Austro-Hungarian rule, and written to popularize liberal ideas. It was considered the most ambitious and thorough liberal undertaking of the time, becoming "the Bible" for a new generation of liberal thinkers who started their career in the mid-1860s. The most typical characteristics of the so-called Omladina generation were that most of them had had a good foreign education (usually in Western Europe and Russia) and were all agreed on the need for the Serbs, who were scattered in four different states, to unite. Jovanović's book provided them with the guidelines they needed to accomplish the task.

Unification, development, and Balkan hegemony: these were the most decisive elements of this philosophy. To justify these national aspirations, Jovanović resorted to Western type of liberalism, but wanted to adopt only those elements which were appropriate to their particular situation. Although his liberalism changed significantly over time, his philosophy had always been centered around the concept of nation. The effect of historical developments on his views may be demonstrated by the titles of his writings from different periods of time: The Base of the Power and Greatness of the Serbs was published in 1870 in Novi Sad, interpreting Serb history from a liberal point of view. The treatise, The Struggle for Life in Society between Nations was published under the aegis of the Serb Scientific Society in Belgrade in 1885, when Jovanović was already a recognized politician and an established political writer.

Works
 In English: Serbian Nation and The Eastern Question, London: Bell and Daldy, 1863
 In Serbian:Politički rečnik (Political Dictionary), Novi Sad & Belgrade, vol. I–IV, 1870–1873.
 Za slobodu i narod (For Freedom and the Nation), Novi Sad 1868.
 Uspomene (Memoirs), ed. by V. Krestić, BIGZ, Belgrade 1988.

Selected articles:
 Savez sila, in Zastava (No. 2, 4 January 1867)
 Naš narodni položaj, in Zastava (No. 90, 28 January 1867)
 Osnovi snage i veličine srbske, in Mlada Srbadija (No. 1–3, 1870)
 Les Serbes et la mission de la Serbie dans l'Europe d'orient (Paris: Librairie Internationale, 1870)
 Društvena i međunarodna borba za opstanak, in Glasnik Srpskog učenog Društva (Vol. 60, 1885)

See also
 Jovan Došenović
 Božidar Knežević
 Konstantin Cukić

References

Further reading 
 Gale Stokes, Legitimacy through Liberalism. Vladimir Jovanović and the Transformation of Serbian Politics, University of Washington press, Seattle & London 1975, XVI–279 p.
 Dušan T. Bataković, "Vladimir Jovanović: apostol liberalizma u Srbiji”, in: J. Trkulja & D. Popović (eds.), Liberalna misao u Srbiji. Prilozi istoriji liberalizma od kraja 18. do sredine 20. veka, CUPS, Beograd 2001, pp. 141–172.
 

1833 births
1922 deaths
19th-century Serbian philosophers
20th-century Serbian philosophers
Serbian political philosophers
Serbian economists
Academic staff of the University of Belgrade
Finance ministers of Serbia
Government ministers of Serbia
Academic staff of Belgrade Higher School
Politicians from Šabac
Writers from Šabac